The Yuppie Fantasia 3 is a 2017 Hong Kong comedy film written, directed by and starring Lawrence Cheng. The film is a sequel to the 1989 film, The Yuppie Fantasia, and the 1990 film, Brief Encounter in Shinjuku. The film was released on 26 January 2017 to celebrate the Chinese New Year, as well as marking the 30th anniversary of the original radio series of the same name created by and starred Cheng in 1986, in which the film franchise was based on.

Plot
Fifty-two year old Leung Foon (Lawrence Cheng) is consciously aware of the three major waves throughout half of his life. First, it was the day his wife, Ann (Carol Cheng), transformed him from a boy to a man. Second, several years later during the day he married Ann and became a henpecked husband. Third, the day when Ann had enough of his incompetence and disappeared with their eight-year-old daughter.

Having experienced these three waves in his life, he converts the grief into strength and transforms from a pity little man to a respected and feared big man. Today, he is a chairman of a listed company well known by those around him. He has learned to resort to every conceivable means to make money. His has enough wealth for his to live stress-free for the rest of his life. However, Foon's biggest regret is that Ann cannot witness his "maturity". However, ever since Foon struck fortune, he was afraid to look at the mirror. For unknown reasons reason, he was afraid to face his  own reflection.

When his daughter, Hei-hei (Larine Tang), who is all grown up, returns, another wave strike Foon's life as he does not know how to be a father to an eighteen-year-old beautiful daughter with a 33D breast because in his memory, Hei-hei was only eight years old. Hei-hei's return also changes Foon as he is finally able to face his own reflection because Hei-hei gave him the courage to be young again and act unruly once more.

Cast
Lawrence Cheng as Leung Foon (梁寬), the main protagonist.
Chrissie Chau as Bobo, Foon's secretary who later quits her job and becomes his girlfriend.
Anthony Chan as Wong Fai (王輝), Foon's superior.
Babyjohn Choi as Wong Ho (王皓), Wong Fai's son who is the owner of an Italian restaurant and gym. He starts out as friends with Hei-hei before becoming her boyfriend.
Louis Cheung as Sam, Wong Fai's subordinate who proclaims himself as Foon's apprentice.
Manfred Wong as Q Tai-long (Q太郎), Foon and Pierre's longtime friend who is currently a traditional Chinese physician.
Peter Lai as Pierre (大古惑),  Foon and Q Tai-long's longtime friend whose current wife can legally enter into a casino in Macau.
Harriet Yeung as Faye-Faye (菲菲), Simon's girlfriend.
Hedwig Tam as Sam, Hei-hei's lesbian friend.
Larine Tang as Hui Hei-hei (許喜喜), born Leung Hei-hei (梁喜喜), Foon and Ann's daughter who was taken by her mother to Taiwan at the age of eight and changed to her mother's surname, Hui. Two years ago, she left for the United States for study before returning to Hong Kong after the death of her mother.
Eric Kot as Market security guard
Calvin Choi as Market stall owner
Remus Choi as Market stall owner
Edmond So as Market stall owner
Julian Cheung as Traffic warden
Joyce Cheng as June, Wong Fai's ex-mistress
Ekin Cheng as Bobo suspected ex-boyfriend
Yuen Yee-man as Ann's double
Ha Chuk-yan as Connie
Carmen Tong as Yan
Cheung Suet-lai as Granny Heung
Oram Matthew Henry as Daniel
Elizaveta Gridneva as Daniel's girlfriend
Nicole Wong as Pierre's granddaughter
Hillary Liao as Pierre's current wife
Cheng Nga-chi as Pierre's second wife
Tsoi Pui-wai as Pierre's third wife
Lee Wing-man as Waitress
Wong Che-heung as Granny
Mark Cheung  as Street stall owner
Lam Tsz-yuen as Street stall owner
Lee Miu-ping as Street stall owner
Leung Wai-ching as Street stall owner
Ng Mei-heung as Street stall owner
Li Wai-chung as Kid at market
Cat Lo as Market worker
Cheng Lai-mui as Market worker
Chan Cheuk-him as Market administrative worker
Ho Chun-wing as Market administrative worker
Lee Ka-kin as Market administrative worker
Lau Siu-tin as Market administrative worker
Yan Ngai-to as Market administrative worker
Kwok Chin-yu as Mall executive
Li Man-fong as Mall executive
Lam Kin-sang as Wong Fai's bodyguard
Herek Wong as Wong Fai's bodyguard
Lai Sheung-ming as Masseur / cafe staff
Lam Wai-keung as Gym staff
Leung Po-shan as Gym staff
Emil Chan as Gym goer
Wong Man-pan as Gym goer
Audrey Chiu as Fat girl at gym
Luk Wing-kei as Cafe staff
Wong Chun as Cafe staff
Chan Ka-leung as Office co-worker
Gloria Chan as Office co-worker
Chan Wing-hei as Office co-worker
Chiu Pik-yu as Office co-worker
Chow Tsz-ying as Office co-worker
Vincent Ho as Office co-worker
Kanice Lau as Office co-worker
Joan Lee as Office co-worker
Michael Tam as Office co-worker
Jarryd Tam as Office co-worker
Judy Tsang as Office co-worker
Yu Ying-tung as Office co-worker
Zaneta Cheng as Office co-worker
Amanda Cheng as Office co-worker
Carol Cheng as Ann Hui (許鞍華), Foon's ex-wife who left him a decade ago with the then eight-year-old Hei-hei for Taiwan. Ann moved to the United States two years ago for Hei-hei to further her studies and she passed away from an accident there. Cheng, who played Ann in the previous installments of the film series, did not participate in the filming for The Yuppie Fantasia 3 since she has retired from acting and as a result, Ann's appearance as a ghost in Foon's hallucinations and memories was created via CGI using footage from the previous installments.

Music

Theme song
You, You, You Cause Me to be Shocked (你你你引致我震盪)
Composer: Yasuo Sugibayashi, Edward Chan, Cousin Fung
Lyricist: Jan Lam (featuring Richard Lam)
Arranger: Edward Chan, Cousin Fung
Producer: Edward Chan
Singer: Jan Lamb

Ending theme
Cordial (傾心)
Composer: Chris Wong
Lyricist: Christopher Wong
Singer: Thomas Chan (featuring Lawrence Cheng)

Reception

Critical
Edmund Lee of the South China Morning Post rated the film score of 3/5 stars and praises Lawrence Cheng's effort in putting heart to the story and notes this third film of the series "ldoesn’t bring disgrace to the brand."

Box office
The Yuppie Fantasia opened on 26 January 2017 in Hong Kong where grossed HK$8.09 million during its first six days of release, finishing at fifth place during its debut weekend. During its second weekend, the film remained at fifth place where it grossed HK$8.32 million, with a cumulative gross of HK$13.43 million by then. On its third weekend, the film fell down to seventh place where it grossed HK$1.94 million, with a cumulative gross of HK$15.38 million by then. By 14 February 2017, the film has accumulated a total gross of over HK$16 million at the Hong Kong box office. The Yuppie Fantasia 3 grossed a total of HK$16,186,955 at the Hong Kong box office, and is tentatively the fifth-highest grossing domestic film of the territory in 2017.

Awards and nominations

References

2017 films
2017 comedy films
Hong Kong comedy films
Hong Kong sequel films
2010s Cantonese-language films
Films based on radio series
Films set in Hong Kong
Films shot in Hong Kong
2010s Hong Kong films